The R199 road is a regional road in Ireland linking the R198 and R202 roads in Counties Cavan and Leitrim. It is a key road for access to the Shannon–Erne Waterway.

From the R198, the road goes north to Killeshandra. Leaving Killeshandra, the road passes Town Lough before turning west. Entering County Leitrim the road passes through Newtowngore. The road then crosses the Ballinamore Canal (a section of the Shannon–Erne Waterway) and passes the eastern shore of Garadice Lough. Passing near to Drumlonan Lough the R199 later ends in Ballinamore, joining the R202.

See also
Roads in Ireland

References

Regional roads in the Republic of Ireland
Roads in County Cavan
Roads in County Leitrim